The Baghiyyatollah al-Azam Military Hospital is a military hospital in Mulla Sadra Street in Vanak, Tehran, Iran. The hospital has ties with the Baqiyatallah University of Medical Sciences.

References

 
 Some 3900 hospitalized in Iran Tehran Province due to Coronavirus
 How Iranian Canadian photojournalist Zahra Kazemi was tortured to death 17 year ago

Hospitals in Iran
Buildings and structures in Tehran
Hospitals with year of establishment missing
Islamic Revolutionary Guard Corps
Military hospitals